Giacomo Bernini (born 22 October 1989) is an Italian rugby union player who plays as a variety of positions. He currently plays for Verona.

Born and raised in Livorno between Lions and Amaranto Livorno, in 2010 season he moved to Amatori Rugby San Donà, playing in Serie A1. In 2011, Giacomo joined top-flight side Prato. That season he won the team's award of "Best Newcomer". In January 2014, he trained with Zebre as a permit player. In June 2014, it was announced that he joined Amatori Rugby San Donà .

external list

References

1989 births
Italian rugby union players
Living people
Rugby union flankers